"Almost Like Being in Love" is a show tune with music by Frederick Loewe and lyrics by Alan Jay Lerner. It was written for the score of their 1947 musical Brigadoon. The song was first sung by David Brooks and Marion Bell, in the Broadway production. It was later performed in the 1954 film version by Gene Kelly.

Michael Johnson version

"Almost Like Being in Love" was revived in a downbeat ballad version by singer Michael Johnson (U.S. no. 32, 1978). His rendition became a Top 10 Adult Contemporary hit in both the U.S. (no. 4) and Canada (no. 10).

Other versions 
There were three hit versions of the song in the United States in 1947: Frank Sinatra's version was the highest charting at no. 20. Mildred Bailey and Mary Martin both charted with the song at no. 21 that year.
Nat King Cole recorded more than one version of the song, including a later version that was used as the closing song in the 1993 movie Groundhog Day which starred Bill Murray. Cole's version, in the key of G major like the original, features a ii–V–I turnaround (2-5-1) in G, a pair of similar 2-5-1 sequences in E major and D major for the bridge, after which it raises the refrain a half-step with a 2-5-1 in A flat major.
Frank Sinatra rerecorded the song for his 1961 album Come Swing with Me!.
The song was also made popular by Shirley Bassey. Like Judy Garland, Bassey performed this song as a medley with the song, "This Can't Be Love".
Bradley Walsh recorded his version of the song for his 2016 debut album Chasing Dreams.
Red Garland recorded his version with Paul Chambers and Art Taylor on his 1957 album Red Garland's Piano.
Ella Fitzgerald recorded a version with Dizzy Gillespie and his orchestra, released on her 1962 album, Ella Sings Broadway.
Erroll Garner recorded a version of the song for his 1966 live album Campus Concert.
Seth MacFarlane recorded his version of the song for his 2017 album In Full Swing (Seth MacFarlane album).
Diana Krall included the song in her 2020 album This Dream of You.

In popular culture
 A portion of the song was sung by Jack Soo’s character Detective Nick Yemana in the third season episode of Barney Miller entitled ‘Hash’ in 1976.
 The song was used in the 1993 movie Groundhog Day (film).
 The song was used in the 1995 movie Grumpier Old Men
 It was sung by the ant Z (voiced by Woody Allen) in the 1998 Dreamworks animated film Antz.
 The song was used in the 2003 movie The Cooler.
It was performed in an episode of The Marvelous Mrs. Maisel'' by Darius de Haas.

References

1947 songs
Songs from musicals
Songs with music by Frederick Loewe
Songs with lyrics by Alan Jay Lerner
Frank Sinatra songs
Judy Garland songs
Michael Johnson (singer) songs
Mildred Bailey songs
Nat King Cole songs
Jazz compositions in G major